Alejandro Piedrahita Diaz (born 3 September 2002) is a Colombian footballer who plays for Club Atlético Banfield as a midfielder on loan from Deportivo Pereira.

Early life
Piedrahita was born in Cartago, Valle del Cauca to Blanca Edith Díaz and Hernando Piedrahita Escobar. He played football at Comfandi Cartago until he was 12 when in 2014 he started playing at El Diamante Sports Club. He joined Deportivo Pereira in 2019.

Career
He made his debut for Deportivo Pereira in the Categoría Primera A in 2020. He scored his first senior goal on April 6, 2021 in the league against Independiente Medellín. He played 22 times in 2022 as his club won the Colombian league title.

He joined Club Atlético Banfield in January 2023 on loan for a year with the option to join permanently for a transfer fee or $700,000 for 80% of his rights.

International career
Piedrahita was selected to train with the Colombia national under-20 football team in May 2021.

Honours

Club
Deportivo Pereira 
Categoría Primera A:  2022 Finalización Winner 

Copa Colombia: 2021 Runner-up

References

External links

2002 births
Living people
Colombian footballers
Colombian expatriate footballers
Argentine Primera División players
Categoría Primera A players
Association football midfielders
Expatriate footballers in Argentina
Deportivo Pereira footballers
Association football wingers
Club Atlético Banfield footballers
Colombian expatriate sportspeople in Argentina
Sportspeople from Valle del Cauca Department